Polygonum engelmannii, common name Engelmann's knotweed, is a North American species of plants in the buckwheat family. It is native to western Canada and the western United States, usually at high elevations in the mountains. It has been found in Alberta, British Columbia, Idaho, Montana, Wyoming, Nevada, Utah, and Colorado.

Polygonum engelmannii is an branching herb up to 30 cm (1 foot) tall. It has clusters of green or purple flowers.

References

engelmannii
Flora of Western Canada
Flora of the Western United States
Flora of the Rocky Mountains
Plants described in 1885
Taxa named by Edward Lee Greene